The Volvo B9RLE was a 9.4-litre engined tri-axle low-entry single-decker bus and double-decker bus chassis manufactured by Volvo between 2010 and 2013. The double-decker can be built as either closed top or open top. It was introduced as an interim replacement for the soon to be discontinued B12BLE in the short gap of years before they had the Euro VI compliant B8RLE ready. At the same time they introduced a tri-axle variant of the B7RLE, but in Volvo's home markets the 290 bhp that the D7E produces is considered way too little for a 15-metre bus.

The most likely reason for introducing the B9RLE a whole year before the end of production for the B12BLE was probably for the introduction of the first prototypes of the Volvo 8900LE in late 2010, which was also the body that most B9RLE received. Some were also bodied as open top double-decker sightseeing buses with the Unvi Urbis 2.5 DD body.

In Sweden a total of 145 were built as 8900LE low-entry city buses to various customers, like Nettbuss and Nobina Sverige, and 7 Unvi-bodied sightseeing buses. In Norway Boreal Transport received 10 as 8900LE for Stavanger and Nobina Norge received 27 (including a prototype from 2010) for Tromsø. Also a Unvi-bodied open top sightseeing bus was delivered to Oslo.

Engines

D9B, 9364 cc, in-line 6 cyl. turbodiesel (2010-2013)
 D9B380 - 280 kW (380 bhp), 1700 Nm, Euro V

References

External links

Volvo B9 Range brochure Volvo Buses

Vehicles introduced in 2010
B9RLE
Low-entry buses
Double-decker buses
Open-top buses
Tri-axle buses
Bus chassis